The Hevey Building Supplies Northamptonshire Cricket League is the top level of competition for recreational club cricket in Northamptonshire, England, and since 1999 has been a designated ECB Premier League. The league headquarters is based in Wellingborough.

Although the league primarily serves Northamptonshire, it also has member clubs from the surrounding counties of Bedfordshire, Buckinghamshire, Cambridgeshire and Leicestershire.

The competing teams in 2020 were intended to be: Brigstock, Brixworth, Desborough Town, Finedon Dolben, Geddington, Horton House, Northampton Saints, Old Northamptonians, Oundle Town, Overstone Park, Peterborough Town, and Rushden and Higham Town.  The 2020 competition was cancelled because of the COVID-19 pandemic. A replacement competition was organised for the later part of the season when cricket again became possible, but with the winners not to be regarded as official league champions.

Winners

Premier Division performance by season from 1999

References

External links
 play-cricket website

English domestic cricket competitions
Cricket in Northamptonshire
ECB Premier Leagues